Nudgee is an electoral district of the Legislative Assembly in the Australian state of Queensland. It is located in the north-eastern suburbs of Brisbane.

Members for Nudgee

Election results

References

External links
 

Nudgee